The 1996 Kilkenny Senior Hurling Championship was the 102nd staging of the Kilkenny Senior Hurling Championship since its establishment by the Kilkenny County Board in 1887. The championship began on 10 August 1996 and ended on 20 October 1996.

Glenmore were the defending champions but were defeated by Young Irelands in the first round.

On 20 October 1996, Young Irelands won the title after a 3–09 to 2–10 defeat of James Stephens in a final replay at Nowlan Park. It was their first ever championship title.

D. J. Carey from the Young Irelands club was the championship's top scorer with 5-35.

Team changes

To Championship

Promoted from the Kilkenny Intermediate Hurling Championship
 Dunnamaggin

From Championship

Relegated to the Kilkenny Intermediate Hurling Championship
 Ballyhale Shamrocks

Results

First round

Relegation play-offs

Quarter-finals

Semi-finals

Final

Championship statistics

Scoring

Top scorers overall

1st - DJ Carey Young Irelands  5-25 : 5 games 

2nd -  Richie Minogue James Stephens 1-29 : 5 games

3rd -   PJ Cody  John Lockes 0-25 : 4 games 

4th -  Niall Moloney St. Martins 3-08 : 2 games

5th - Brian Leahy  James Stephens 3-08 : 5 games

References

Kilkenny Senior Hurling Championship
Kilkenny Senior Hurling Championship